Sofiia Yuriyivna Holichenko (born 23 November 2004) is a Ukrainian pair skater. With her skating partner, Artem Darenskyi, she competed in the final segment at the 2022 European Championships and is the 2022 Ukrainian national champion.

Career

Early career 
As a singles skater, Holichenko most notably won the bronze medal at the 2018 Ukrainian junior championships. She competed a single season in pairs with Ivan Pavlov, winning a bronze medal at the senior Ukrainian championships.

2020–2021 season 
In June, it was announced that she had formed a new partnership with Artem Darenskyi.

After obtaining the required minimum technical elements scores, Holichenko/Darenskyi were nominated to represent Ukraine at the 2021 World Championships in Stockholm. They withdrew a few days before the start of the competition, having tested positive for coronavirus.

2021–2022 season 
Holichenko/Darenskyi began the season at the 2021 CS Nebelhorn Trophy, attempting to qualify a berth for Ukraine at the 2022 Winter Olympics.  They placed eleventh at the event, outside the qualifications. However, Ukraine qualified to the Olympic team event due to Anastasiia Shabotova qualifying to the women's competition at Nebelhorn, allowing for a Ukrainian pair to be sent for that. Holichenko/Darenskyi went on to finish fifth at the Budapest Trophy.

After winning their first Ukrainian national title, Holichenko/Darenskyi placed fifteenth at the 2022 European Championships in Tallinn. Days later, they were named to the Ukrainian Olympic team. They finished ninth among nine pairs entered in the short program of the Olympic team event. This was their only performance at the Games, as Team Ukraine did not advance to the second stage of the competition and finished tenth.

The team returned home to Dnipro after the Olympics and immediately found themselves in the midst of Vladimir Putin's invasion of Ukraine. They enlisted Canadian music editor Hugo Chouinard to change their short program music in advance of the 2022 World Championships in Montpellier, hoping to inspire the country with Ukrainian music. They undertook a six-day journey to France, via Romania, Italy and Poland, with Darenskyi saying that their goal was "to show that Ukrainian athletes are fighting for their country." On arrival, they received a standing ovation and placed thirteenth in the short program with very limited training. In light of this, they opted not to compete in the free skate. They had left home knowing they would not be able to return, instead planning to live and train in the Polish city of Toruń for the foreseeable future.

Programs 
 With Darenskyi

Competitive highlights 
CS: Challenger Series

With Darenskyi

With Pavlov

Ladies' singles

References

External links 
 
 
 

2004 births
Living people
Ukrainian female pair skaters
Sportspeople from Kyiv
Figure skaters at the 2022 Winter Olympics
Olympic figure skaters of Ukraine